This list of the Paleozoic life of Arkansas contains the various prehistoric life-forms whose fossilized remains have been reported from within the US state of Arkansas and are between 541 and 252.17 million years of age.

A

 †Adnatoceras
 †Adnatoceras alaskense
 †Ahrensisporites
 †Ahrensisporites guerickei
 †Amphiscapha
 †Amphiscapha intermedius
 †Amphissites
 †Amphissites rugosus
 †Amplexizaphrentis
 †Amplexizaphrentis maneri – type locality for species
 †Amplexizaphretis
 †Amplexizaphretis maneri – type locality for species
 †Amplexus
 †Ananaspis
 †Anchicrinus
 †Anchicrinus planulatus
 †Ancillotoechia
 †Ancillotoechia marginata
 †Angyomphalus
 †Angyomphalus desultoria – type locality for species
 †Angyomphalus discus
 †Anomphalomorpha – report made of unidentified related form or using admittedly obsolete nomenclature
 †Anthracoceras
 †Anthracoceras paucilobum
 †Anthracomartus
 †Anthracomartus trilobitus – type locality for species
 †Anthracospirifer
 †Antiquatonia
 †Antirhynchonella
 †Antirhynchonella thomasi
 †Aphelaeceras
 †Aphelaeceras arkansanum – type locality for species
 †Aphralysia – tentative report
 †Apiculatasporites
 †Apiculatasporites variocorneus
 †Apotocardium
 †Apotocardium peculiare – type locality for species
 †Apotocardium polymitarium – type locality for species
 †Apotocardium snideri – tentative report
 †Arcanoceras
 †Arcanoceras furnishi – type locality for species
   †Archaeocidaris
 Archaeolithophyllum – tentative report
 †Archimastax
 †Archimastax americanus – type locality for species
  †Archimedes
 †Archimylacris
 †Archimylacris venusta – type locality for species
 †Arkacrinus
 †Arkacrinus dubius
 †Arkanites
 †Arkanites relictus
 †Arkoceras
 †Arkoceras exiguum
 †Asketomorpha – type locality for genus
 †Asketomorpha grandis – type locality for species
 †Asphaltina
 †Astartella
 †Astartella concentrica – or unidentified comparable form
 †Athyris
  †Atrypa
 †Atrypina
 †Atrypina erugata
  †Aviculopecten
 †Aviculopecten inspeciosus
 †Aviculopecten jennyi
 †Aviculopecten morrowensis
 †Aviculopecten squamula
 † Avonia
 †Avonia honeycreekensis
 †Axinolobus
 †Axinolobus modulus – type locality for species

B

 †Bactrites
 †Bactrites carbonarius
 †Bactrites gaitherensis
 †Bactrites redactus
 †Bactrites smithianus
 †Bactritimimus
 †Bactritimimus girtyi – type locality for species
 †Bactritimimus ulrichi – type locality for species
 †Baiosoma
 †Baiosoma cucullata – type locality for species
 Bairdia
 †Bairdia girtyi
 †Barytichisma
 †Barytichisma clubinei
 †Barytichisma ozarkana
 †Baschkirites
 †Baschkirites librovitchi
 †Beecheria
  †Bellerophon
 †Bellerophon welshi
 †Bisatoceras
 †Bisatoceras secundum
 †Bistrialites
 †Bistrialites bicostatus – type locality for species
 †Boesites
 †Boesites scotti
 †Borestus
 †Boucotides
 †Boucotides barrandei
 †Brachycycloceras
 †Brachycycloceras washingtonense – type locality for species
 †Brachymimulus
 †Brachymimulus americanus
 †Brachymimulus elongatus
 †Brachythyris
 †Bradyphyllum
 †Bradyphyllum lesliense – type locality for species
 †Branneroceras
 †Branneroceras branneri
 †Bridgeites
 †Bridgeites planidorsalis – type locality for species
 †Buttsia
 †Buttsia drabensis
 †Buxtonia

C

 †Cancelloceras
 †Cancelloceras hunstvillense – type locality for species
 †Cancelloceras huntsvillense – type locality for species
 †Caneyella
 †Caneyella peculiaris
 †Caneyella percostata
 †Caneyella wapanuckensis – or unidentified comparable form
 †Caninostrotion
 †Caninostrotion variabilis
 †Carcharopsis
 †Carcharopsis wortheni
 †Cardiomorpha – tentative report
 †Cardiomorpha inflata
 †Caryocrinites
 †Cavellina
  †Cavusgnathus
 †Centrotarphyceras
 †Centrotarphyceras yellvillense
 †Ceratopea
 †Ceratopea unguis
 †Cheilocephalus
 †Cheilocephalus brachyops
  †Cheirurus
 †Cheirurus phollikodes – type locality for species
 †Cheirurus prolixus – type locality for species
 †Choctawites
 †Choctawites choctawensis
 †Chonetes
 †Clathrospira
 †Clathrospira virguncula
  †Cleiothyridina
 †Cliffia
 †Cliffia lataegenae
 †Cluthoceras
 †Cluthoceras glicki – type locality for species
 †Clytoceras
 †Clytoceras capax
 †Coelogasteroceras
 †Coelogasteroceras gracile
 †Comanchia
 †Comanchia amplooculata
  †Composita
 †Compsonema
 †Convolutispora
 †Copiceras
 †Copiceras erectum
 †Cornuproetus
 †Cornuproetus kyphora – type locality for species
 †Cranaena
 †Crassispora
 †Crassispora kosankei
 †Cravenoceras
 †Cravenoceras lineolatum – type locality for species
 †Criboconcha
 †Cristatisporites
 †Cristatisporites connexus
 †Cristatisporites indignabundus
 †Cromyocrinus
 †Cromyocrinus grandis – type locality for species
 †Crurithyris
 †Crurithyris parva
 †Ctenobactrites
 †Ctenobactrites lesliensis – type locality for species
 †Cupulocorona
 †Cupulocorona gemmiformis
 †Cupulocorona osgoodensis
 †Cyclogranisporites
 †Cycloplectoceras
 †Cycloplectoceras funatum
 †Cycloplectoceras miseri
 †Cymoceras
 †Cymoceras cracens
 †Cymostrophia – report made of unidentified related form or using admittedly obsolete nomenclature
 †Cypricardella
 †Cypricardella subalata
 †Cypricardinia – tentative report
 †Cypricardinia fayettevillensis
 †Cyrtina

D

   †Dalmanites – type locality for genus
 †Dalmanites bassleri
 †Dalmanites howelli
 †Dalmanites ptyktorhion – type locality for species
 †Decoroproetus
 †Decoroproetus anaglyptus – type locality for species
 †Decoroproetus corycoeus
  †Deiphon
 †Deiphon longifrons
 †Dellea
 †Dellea suada
 †Delops
 †Densosporites
 †Densosporites annulatus
 †Densosporites irregularis
 †Densosporites sphaerotriangularis
 †Densosporites triangularis
 †Dentoceras
 †Dentoceras belemnitiforme – type locality for species
 †Desmoinesia
 †Diaboloceras
 †Diaboloceras neumeieri – type locality for species
 †Diaboloceras varicostatum
  †Diacalymene
 †Diacalymene altirostris
 †Diacamaropsis
 †Diacamaropsis parva
 †Diaphragmus
 †Dicamaropsis
 †Dicamaropsis parva
 †Dicoelosia
 †Dicoelosia bilobella
 †Dielasma
 †Dinocycloceras
 †Dinocycloceras ballianum – or unidentified comparable form
 †Dinocycloceras prolixum
 †Diphuicrinus
 †Diphuicrinus croneisi
 †Dolerorthis – tentative report
 †Dolerorthis nanella
 †Dolorthoceras
 †Dolorthoceras caneyanum – or unidentified comparable form
 †Dolorthoceras incisum – type locality for species
 †Dolorthoceras tenuifilosum – type locality for species

E

 †Echinaria
 †Echinoconchus
 †Economolopsis – type locality for genus
 †Economolopsis gordoni – type locality for species
 †Ectogrammysia – type locality for genus
 †Ectogrammysia crassatis – type locality for species
 †Edmondia
 †Edmondia equilateralis
 †Edmooroceras
 †Edmooroceras plummeri
  †Encrinurus
 †Encrinurus egani
 †Endolobus
 †Endolobus clorensis
 †Eoasianites
 †Eoasianites smithwickensis
 †Eophacops
 †Eophacops fontana – type locality for species
 †Eopteria
 †Eopteria richardsoni
 †Eospirifer
 †Eospirifer acutolineatus
 †Eowellerites
 †Eowellerites discoidalis – type locality for species
 †Eowellerites moorei – or unidentified comparable form
 †Ephippioceras
 †Ephippioceras ferratum
 †Epistroboceras
 †Epistroboceras lesliense – type locality for species
 †Epistroboceras mangeri – type locality for species
 †Epistroboceras pitkinense – type locality for species
   †Eucalyptocrinites
 †Euchondria
 †Euconospira
 †Euconospira desereti – or unidentified related form
 †Euconospira disjuncta
 †Euloxoceras
 †Euloxoceras angustius – type locality for species
 †Euloxoceras greenei
 †Eumetria
 †Eumorphoceras
 †Eumorphoceras bisulcatum
 †Eumorphoceras milleri – type locality for species
 †Eumorphoceras ornatissimum – or unidentified comparable form
  †Euomphalus
 †Euomphalus konobasis – type locality for species
 †Euomphalus variabilis – type locality for species
 †Eupachycrinus
 †Eupachycrinus magister – or unidentified comparable form
 †Euphemites
 †Euphemites chesterensis – type locality for species
 †Euphemites whirligigi – type locality for species

F

 †Fayettevillea
 †Fayettevillea planorbis – type locality for species
 †Florinites
 †Florinites similis
 †Florinites volans

G

 †Garwoodia – tentative report
 †Gastrioceras
 †Gastrioceras adaense
 †Gastrioceras fittsi
 †Gastrioceras formosum – type locality for species
  Gastrochaenolites
 †Gastrochaenolites anauchen
 †Gattendorfia
 †Geisina – tentative report
 †Geisina retiferiformis
 †Girtyoceras
 †Girtyoceras welleri – type locality for species
 †Girtyspira
 †Girtyspira microspirula – type locality for species
 †Girvanella
 †Glabrocingulum
 †Glabrocingulum binodosum
 †Glabrocingulum coronulum – type locality for species
 †Glabrocingulum parasolum – type locality for species
 †Glabrocingulum parvanodum – type locality for species
 †Glabrocingulum quadrigatum
 †Glaphyrites
 †Glaphyrites depressus
 †Glaphyrites fayettevillae – type locality for species
 †Glaphyrites morrowensis
 †Globozyga
 †Globozyga mediocris – type locality for species
 †Glyphiolobus
  †Glyptambon – type locality for genus
 †Glyptambon verrucosus
 †Glyptopleura
 †Glyptopleura angulata
 †Glyptopleura inopinata
 †Gnathodus
 †Gnathodus texanus
  †Goniatites
  †Goniatites crenistria – or unidentified related form
 †Goniatites granosus
 †Goniatites multiliratus
 †Gordonites
 †Gordonites filifer
 †Gordonites matheri
 †Granulatisporites
 †Granulatisporites adnatoides
 †Graphiadactyllis
 †Graphiadactyllis arkansana
 †Graphiadactyllis fayettevillensis

H

 †Haplistion
 †Haplistion sphaericum
 †Harpidella
 †Harpidella butorus – type locality for species
 †Harpidella spinulocervix
 †Healdia
 †Hematites
 †Hematites barbarae
 †Holocystites
 †Holocystites alternatus
 †Homoceratoides
 †Homoceratoides cracens
 †Homoeospirella
 †Homoeospirella costatula
 †Homoeospirella pygmaea
 †Hormotoma
 †Hormotoma anna
 †Hormotoma artemesia – type locality for species
 †Housia
 †Housia vacuna
 †Howellella
 †Howellella splendens
 †Hudsonoceras
 †Hudsonoceras moorei
 †Hustedia
 †Hydreionocrinus
 †Hypotetragona – tentative report

I

 †Imitoceras
 †Imitoceras sinuatum – type locality for species
 †Imoella – type locality for genus
 †Imoella obscura – type locality for species
 †Imogloba
 †Imogloba gandyensis
 †Imonautilus – type locality for genus
 †Imonautilus meeki – type locality for species
 †Incisurella
 †Incisurella prima
 †Inflatia
 †Inflatia clydensis
 †Irvingella
 †Irvingella major

J

 †Janthimorpha – report made of unidentified related form or using admittedly obsolete nomenclature
 †Jasperoceras
 †Jasperoceras costatum

K

 †Kaskia
 †Kaskia chesterensis
 †Kazakhstania – tentative report
 †Kindbladia
 †Kindbladia wichitaensis
 †Kinkaidia
 †Kinkaidia trigonalis
 †Kirkbya
 †Kirkbya reflexa
 †Kirkbyella
 †Kirkbyella quadrata
 †Knightoceras
 †Knightoceras oxylobatum – type locality for species
 †Knightoceras patulum
 †Knoxisporites
 †Knoxisporites triradiatus
 †Kozlowskiellina
 †Kozlowskiellina vaningeni
 †Krotovia

L

 †Laevigatosporites
 †Laevigatosporites desmoinesensis
 †Laevigatosporites vulgaris
 †Lasanocrinus
 †Lasanocrinus strigosus
 †Leangella
 †Leangella dissiticostella
 †Leonardophyllum
 †Leonardophyllum arkansanum
 †Lepdioproetus
 †Lepdioproetus xeo – type locality for species
 †Leptaena
 †Leptagonia
 †Leptocyrtoceras
 †Leptocyrtoceras curvatum
 †Leptocyrtoceras powellense
 †Leptodesma
 †Limipecten
  †Lingula
 †Linoproductus
 †Liroceras – tentative report
 †Lissatrypa
 †Lissatrypa clairensis
 †Lissostrophia
 †Lophamplexus – tentative report
 †Lophophyllidium
 †Lophophyllidium imoense – type locality for species
 †Lophotriletes
 †Lophotriletes microsaetosus
 †Lusitanites
 †Lusitanites subcircularis
 †Lycospora
 †Lycospora micropapillata
 †Lycospora pellucida
 †Lygdozoon – type locality for genus
 †Lygdozoon anoplos – type locality for species
 †Lygdozoon arkansanum
 †Lygdozoon collatum – type locality for species
 †Lysocystites – or unidentified related form

M

 †Macropotamorhynchus
 †Macropotamorhynchus chouteauensis
 †Macropotamorhynchus tuta
 †Macrostylocrinus
 †Magnumbonella
 †Mammoides
 †Mariceras
 †Marmolatella
 †Marmolatella imoensis – type locality for species
 †Marmolatella macgordoni – type locality for species
 †Meekospira
 †Meekospira minuta
 †Megaglossoceras
 †Megaglossoceras glicki – type locality for species
 †Megapronorites
 †Megapronorites baconi
 †Meristina
 †Meristina clairensis
  †Metacoceras
 †Metacromyocrinus
 †Metacromyocrinus gillumi
 †Metadimorphoceras
 †Metadimorphoceras subdivisum
 †Metutharocrinus
 †Metutharocrinus cockei – type locality for species
 †Michelinia
 †Michelinia macerimuris – type locality for species
 †Michelinia meekana
 †Michelinia tenuicula
 †Michelinoceras
 †Michelinoceras wapanuckense
 †Microcheilinella – tentative report
 †Mitorthoceras
 †Mitorthoceras crebriliratum
 †Mitorthoceras girtyi – type locality for species
 †Mitorthoceras perfilosum
 †Mitorthoceras yellvillense – type locality for species
 †Monoceratina
 †Mooreoceras
 †Mooreoceras wedingtonianum – type locality for species
 †Mourlonia
 †Mourlonia lativittata
 †Muensteroceras
 †Muensteroceras arkansanum – type locality for species
 †Muensteroceras collinsoni – type locality for species
 †Muensteroceras pisiforme – type locality for species
 †Multithecopora
 †Myalina
 †Myalina parallela – or unidentified comparable form

N

 †Naiadites – tentative report
  †Naticopsis
 †Naticopsis clinovata – or unidentified comparable form
 †Naticopsis genevievensis
 †Neochonetes
 †Neoglyphioceras
 †Neoglyphioceras caneyanum
 †Neoglyphioceras crebriliratum
 †Nostocites
 †Nucleospira
 †Nucleospira raritas
 †Nuculavus
 †Nuculavus okawensis
 †Nuculopsis
 †Nuculopsis shumardana

O

 †Ogygoceras
 †Ogygoceras gracile
 †Onychotreta
 †Onychotreta lenta
 †Onychotreta mesleri
 †Onychotreta miseri
 †Onychotreta multiplicata
 †Onychotreta plicata
 †Orbiculoidea
 †Orospira
 †Orospira elegantula
 †Orthobairdia
 †Orthobairdia cestriensis
 †Orthonychia
 †Orthonychia compressum
 †Orthonychia ungula
 †Orthostrophella
 †Orthostrophella clairensis
 †Orthotetes
 †Ortonella – tentative report
 †Ortonella kershopensis
 †Ovatia
 †Oxoplecia
 †Oxoplecia infrequens
 †Ozarcus – type locality for genus
 †Ozarcus mapesae – type locality for species

P

 †Pachylyroceras
 †Pachylyroceras cloudi
 †Pachylyroceras newsomi
 †Paladin
 †Paladin mucronatus
 †Palaeacis
 †Palaeacis carinata
 †Palaeocapulus
 †Palaeocapulus undata
 †Palaeoneilo
 †Palaeoneilo sera
 †Paleoconus
 †Paleoconus bakeri – type locality for species
 †Paleyoldia
 †Paleyoldia angustia – type locality for species
 †Paleyoldia bruta – type locality for species
 †Palmerocrinus
 †Palmerocrinus kesslerensis – type locality for species
 †Paracravenoceras
 †Paracravenoceras ozarkense – type locality for species
 †Paracromyocrinus
 †Paracromyocrinus oklahomensis
 †Paradimorphoceras
 †Paralegoceras
 †Paralegoceras iowense
 †Paralegoceras texanum
 †Parallelodon
 †Parallelodon cancellosus – or unidentified comparable form
 †Paramphicrinus
 †Paramphicrinus magnus – type locality for species
 †Paraparchites – tentative report
 †Paraparchites cyclopeus
 †Parastrophinella
 †Parastrophinella lepida
 †Parvaxon
 †Parvaxon minutum
 †Patellilabia
 †Patellilabia laevigata
 †Patellilabia rhombadella – type locality for species
 †Patellilabia sulcata – type locality for species
  †Pentremites
 †Pericyclus
 †Perigrammoceras
 †Perimestocrinus
 †Perimestocrinus teneris
 †Peripetoceras
 †Peripetoceras ozarkense – type locality for species
 †Permophorus
 †Phaneroceras
 †Phaneroceras compressum
 †Phaneroceras kesslerense – type locality for species
 †Pharkidonotus
 †Phestia
 †Phestia corrugata – type locality for species
 †Phestia obtusa – type locality for species
 †Phestia wortheni – type locality for species
 †Phricodothyris
 †Pilosisporites
 †Pilosisporites williamsii
 †Pionoceras
 †Pionoceras smithvillense
 †Placotriplesia
 †Placotriplesia juvenis
 †Placotriplesia praecipta
   †Platyceras
 †Platyceras latum
 †Platyceras oxynotum – type locality for species
 †Plectatrypa
 †Plectatrypa arctoimbricata
 †Plectodonta – tentative report
 †Plicochonetes
 †Plicocyrtia
 †Plicocyrtia arkansana
 †Polidevcia
 †Polidevcia stevensiana
 †Posidonia
 †Posidonia nasuta
 †Productina
 †Productina sampsoni
 †Productus
  †Proetus
 †Proetus vaningeni
 †Prolecanites
 †Prolecanites lyoni – or unidentified comparable form
 †Proshumardites
 †Proshumardites morrowanus
 †Prospira
 †Prospira latior
 †Prothyris
 †Prothyris crista – type locality for species
 †Prothyris soleniformis – or unidentified comparable form
 †Protocycloceras
 †Protocycloceras arkansaense
 †Protocycloceras smithvillense
 †Pseudagnostus
 †Pseudagnostus communis
 †Pseudokingstonia
 †Pseudokingstonia exotica
 †Pseudopronorites
 †Pseudopronorites arkansiensis
 †Pseudopronorites quinni
 †Pseudorthoceras
 †Pseudorthoceras knoxense
 †Pseudorthoceras stonense – type locality for species
 †Pseudozygopleura
 †Pterocephalia
 †Pterocephalia sanctisabae
 †Ptychomphalina
 †Ptychomphalina magna – type locality for species
 †Punctospirifer
 †Pycnoceras
 †Pycnoceras clausum
 †Pygmaeoceras
 †Pygmaeoceras solidum

Q

 †Quinnites
 †Quinnites henbesti
 †Quinnites textum

R

 †Radnoria
 †Ramosites
 †Raphiophorus
 †Raphiophorus niagarensis
 †Rayonnoceras
 †Rayonnoceras eccentricum – type locality for species
 †Rayonnoceras fayettevillense
 †Rayonnoceras irregulare – or unidentified comparable form
 †Rayonnoceras nobile – or unidentified comparable form
 †Rayonnoceras protentum – type locality for species
 †Rayonnoceras solidiforme
 †Rayonnoceras vaughanianum
 †Rectangulina
 †Resserella
 †Reticulariina
 †Reticuloceras
 †Reticuloceras tiro
 †Reticuloceras wainwright
 †Reticuloceras wainwrighti
 †Reticycloceras
 †Reticycloceras croneisi – type locality for species
 †Reticycloceras girtyi – type locality for species
 †Reticycloceras peytonense – type locality for species
 †Reticycloceras sequoyahense
 †Retispira
 †Retispira cincta
 †Retispira ordinata – or unidentified related form
 †Retispira yochelsoni – type locality for species
 †Retites
 †Retites semiretia
 †Reviya
 †Reviya planus – or unidentified related form
 †Rhipidomella
 †Rhynchopora
 †Rhytiophora
 †Rhytiophora blairi
 †Richardsonites
 †Richardsonites richardsonianum
 †Richardsonites richardsonianus
 †Roundyella
 †Roundyella simplex

S

 †Sandia
 †Sanguinolites
 †Sanguinolites simulans – tentative report
 †Sansabella
 †Sansabella fayettevillensis
 †Sansabella reticulata
 †Savitrisporites
 †Savitrisporites nux
 †Schartymites
 †Schartymites paynei
 †Schellwienella
 †Schizodus
 †Schizodus chesterensis
 †Schizophoria
 †Schuchertella
 †Schulzospora
 †Schulzospora rara
 †Schumardella
 †Schumardella obsolecens
 †Sedenticellula
 †Sedgwickia
 †Seminolites
 †Septatrypa
 †Septatrypa havliceki
 †Septimyalina
 †Septimyalina perattenuata – or unidentified comparable form
 †Serenida
 †Serenida seminalis
 †Shaleria
 †Solenochilus
 †Solenochilus floweri – type locality for species
 †Solenochilus peculiare – or unidentified comparable form
 †Solenomorpha
 †Solenomorpha nitida
 †Spathelopsis – type locality for genus
 †Spathelopsis browni – type locality for species
  †Sphaerexochus
 †Sphaerexochus glaber – type locality for species
 †Sphenotus
 †Sphenotus branneri
 †Sphenotus dubius
 †Sphenotus meslerianus
 †Sphenotus pisinnus – type locality for species
 †Sphenotus washingtonensis
  †Spirifer
 †Spiriferellina
 †Staurocephalus
 †Staurocephalus lagena – type locality for species
 †Staurocephalus oarion – type locality for species
 †Stearoceras
 †Stearoceras gibbosum – or unidentified related form
 †Stearoceras smithi – type locality for species
 †Stenoglaphyrites
 †Stenoglaphyrites involutus – type locality for species
 †Stenoglaphyrites miseri – type locality for species
 †Stenopronorites
 †Sthenarocalymene
 †Sthenarocalymene scutula – type locality for species
    †Stigmaria
 †Stigmaria wedingtonensis
 †Stioderma
 †Stioderma hadra – type locality for species
 †Streptis
 †Streptis glomerata
 †Streptorhynchus
 †Strobeus
 †Stroboceras
 †Stroboceras gordoni – type locality for species
 †Stroboceras sulcatum – or unidentified comparable form
 †Sudeticeras
 †Sulcella
 †Sulcogirtyoceras
 †Sulcogirtyoceras jasperense – type locality for species
 †Sulcogirtyoceras limatum
 †Sutherlandia
 †Syngastrioceras
 †Syngastrioceras globosum
 †Syngastrioceras oblatum
 †Syngastrioceras scotti
 †Syntrophopsis
 †Syntrophopsis grandis – type locality for species

T

 †Tectamichelina – type locality for genus
 †Tectamichelina mangeri – type locality for species
 †Teiichispira
 †Teiichispira odenvillensis
 †Tesuquea
 †Tetracamera
 †Tetratylis – tentative report
 †Tetratylus – tentative report
 †Torynifer
 †Trepspira
 †Trepspira tentative report type locality for species – informal
 †Triboloceras – tentative report
 †Tripteroceroides – tentative report
  Trypanites
 †Tylonautilus
 †Tylonautilus gratiosus

U

 †Utharocrinus
 †Utharocrinus pentanodus

V

 †Valhallites
 †Valhallites ornatus – type locality for species
 †Valhallites tuberculatus – type locality for species
 †Valhallites westforkensis – type locality for species
 †Verneuilites
 †Verneuilites pygmaeus
 †Virgaspongia – type locality for genus
 †Virgaspongia ichnata – type locality for species
 †Virginiata
 †Virginiata arkansana
 †Voiseyella
 †Vorticina
 †Vorticina venata

W

 †Wichitoceras
 †Wichitoceras compressum
 †Wiedeyoceras
 †Wiedeyoceras williamsi – type locality for species
 †Wilkingia
 †Wilkingia inflata – or unidentified comparable form
 †Winslowoceras
 †Winslowoceras henbesti – type locality for species

X

 †Xenocheilos
 †Xenocheilos minutum

Y

 †Yochelsonospira
 †Yochelsonospira tenuilineata

Z

 †Zaphrentites
 †Zaphrentites arkansanus
 †Zia
 †Zygopleura – report made of unidentified related form or using admittedly obsolete nomenclature

References
 

Paleozoic
Arkansas